NGC 1276 is an optical double star system located in the constellation Perseus. The system was discovered by astronomer John Dreyer on December 12, 1876. The pair consists of two 15th magnitude stars known as Pul -3 270349 and Pul -3 270357 that are unrelated as they lie at different distances from each other.

The two stars are about the same size and luminosity as the Sun.

See also 
 List of NGC objects (1001–2000)
 Double Star

References

External links 

Double stars
Perseus (constellation)
1276
Astronomical objects discovered in 1876